Prem Anand (Odia: ପ୍ରେମ ଆନନ୍ଦ) is an Indian music director and composer. He usually works in Odia film and television industry. In 2006, he started his career as a music director through the Odia movie Tu Eka Ama Saha Bharasa and worked as a music director in more than 60 Odia films. Apart from Odia films, he composed music for Odia daily shops, Bhajans and Jatra songs. In 2009, Anand worked as a music director for the Hindi film Dekha Bhai Dekh in 2019, he composed music for Bollywood film Luv U Turn. Apart from Odia and Hindi films, he composed music for Marathi and Bengali films. He composed the 2023 Men's FIH Hockey World Cup anthem.

Early life and education 
Anand was born on 23 January 1975 at Saanagaan in Kendrapara district of Odisha to a Hindu family. He was the middle child of the family with an elder brother and a sister. His family was against his music career since childhood, but somehow he managed to learn harmonium from his village.

After passing out from the Gopinathpur Sanskrit Vidyalaya in the early 1990s, Prem Anand joined the Utkal Sangeet Mahavidyalaya to learn music and trained himself in the Odissi. He honed his skills there under gurus like late Bhikari Bal, Gopala Chandra Panda, and Ramahari Das.

He graduated in history in 1997 from the Marshaghai College and later trained himself in Hindustani classical music. Then he joined a school in Raygada as a music teacher, but later resigned from that post and started traveling from village to village and composing for plays and small opera troupes.

Career 
After school, Anand was composing music for small theaters and plays, but in 1993, he got a chance to compose one song for Janani Gananaatya, one of the famous Opera companies in Odisha. There he composed a song for the play named Naalu Bhai Ra Mo Naali Gaamuchhaa. Later, he worked for many other Opera troupes like Parbati Gananaatya, Kalinga Gananatya, Tulasi Ganantya, Gouri Gananatya, Trinaatha Gananaatya, Shivani Ganantya, Tarapur Opera, and Indrabhubana Gananaatya.

In 1996 his 1st album Maa Gojabayani was released which is a devotional song. Later his album Anamika Nayika under Sarthak Music had made him famous. He has composed more than 200 Odia albums. Some of his popular albums are Janha Re, Hey Priyatama, Manini, Kanya Kumari, Malliphula Gajara, Shila I Love You, Michhei Jhia, Lotani Para, Tu Besi Paduchu Mane, Nali Tikili, Rangani Phula, Premi and Sei Jhiati.

In 2005 he got a chance to work in the Odia film industry as a music director. His first Odia movie was Tu Eka Ama Saha Bharasa starring Siddhanta Mahapatra, Jyoti Mishra, and Mihir Das in the lead role. This film was released in 2006. Later he worked for more than 60 Odia films like Rasika Nagara, Love dot Com, Aailare Odia Pua, Chandini I Miss You, Hata Dahri Chalutha, Something Something 2, Gapa Hele bi Sata, Agastya, Kabula Barabula, Happy Lucky, Prem Kumar: Salesman of the year, Nimki and Biju Babu.

In 2009 Anand worked as a music composer in a Hindi film Dekh Bhai Dekh. In 2019 he composed another song for Bollywood film Luv U Turn.

Anand composed music for some Odia daily shops like Nua Bohu, Sankha Sindura, Swabhima for Tarang TV, To Pain Mun, Samparka Hrudayara, Jibana Satha for Zee Sarthak. Ahuti for ETV Odia, Khusi for DD Odia and Abhinetri for Zee Kalinga. Apart from serials, he has composed music for shows like Srimati Kam Nuhanti, Sampurna, Chal Pherijiba Gaon ku.

He also worked as a judge some Odia musical reality shows. He judged Amari Swara on ETV Odia in 2008 along with Tansen Singh and Nijam. Later he judged Zee Sarthak's musical reality shows Sa Re Ga Ma Pa Swara Ra Mahamancha and Sa Re Ga Ma Pa Little Champs.

A patriotic song titled Ae maati Odisha, ae jaati Odia was released on 1 April 2021 in the occasion of Utkla Dibasa. Fifteen popular singers contributed their voice to that song along with the Chief Minister Odisha, Naveen Patnaik and Governor of Odisha, Ganeshi Lal. Governor personally visited the studio to lend his voice for this song.

In 2021, Premanand has composed the music for Odia TV Series Srimandira based on Kanchi Abhiyan of Purushottama Deva starring Buddhaditya Mohanty. The title track was composed with the A cappella music format and 15 than 15 singers has sung this song. A cappella was for the 1st time in the Odia musical industry.

He composed the 2023 Men's FIH Hockey World Cup anthem named Jai Ho Hindustan Ki. This was written by Sameer Anjaan and sung by Sukhvinder Singh.

Personal life 
Premanand is married to Saswati Acharya, a software engineer by profession. This couple has two sons.

Filmography

Awards 

 Odisha State Film Awards for Chandini I Miss You in 2011
 Odisha Excellence Award in 2018
 Odia Filmfare Awards for Gapa Hele bi Sata in 2016, Baby in 2017, Tu Mo Love Story 2 in 2019
 Tarang Cine Awards for Chandini I Miss You in 2012 and Gapa hele bi Sata in 2016.

References

External links

 

Indian film score composers
Living people
1975 births
People from Odisha
People from Kendrapara district